Ambush at Sorinor is a video game released by Mindcraft in 1993 for MS-DOS. It is a sequel to Siege from 1992. It is made with the same game engine as Siege. It takes place in the same universe as The Magic Candle.

Gameplay
In the game six rival clans vie for the control of the realm. The player controls a mercenary leader who assembles fighters for missions.

Reception

H.E. Dille of Computer Gaming World gave a negative review and summarized: "The folks at Mindcraft are a decent lot, who genuinely try to provide gamers with what they want. Given that, one can only hope that they go back to the drawing board with this engine before releasing another title of similar ilk. In addition to the tactical model, they must also invest a lot of time in refining the AI that controls the computer opponent. It was not uncommon for VIP groups to continue blindly into my Ambushers rather than trying to go around or even fleeing until escort help could arrive. With that kind of AI, one wonders who is getting ambushed in Ambush at Sorinor, the computer troops or the purchaser of the game? Unfortunately, there are too many occasions when it feels like the latter."

References

External links

1993 video games
DOS games
DOS-only games
Mindcraft games
Strategy video games
Video games developed in the United States